A gag character is usually a character that is rarely used, and typically exhibits little or no personality except to serve as the conduit for a joke in comic strips and TV shows.

Narrative function
Gag characters usually appear in single panel cartoons that do not follow any main or centralized character (although they might follow similar types of jokes).  Some examples include The Far Side, Bizarro, and Speed Bump.  Because of this, gag characters are not given a broad depth of characterization, as to compliment the lack of narrative continuity present in their format.

Gag characters also appear on television.  However, a gag character on a syndicated or serialized show usually makes one appearance during the series' run.  Any subsequent appearances make the character into a secondary character within the work.

Often, a gag character's usage is centered around humor rooted in the character's behavior or appearance. However, there are cases where a gag character may also be the main characters of a particular narrative or even series. In such cases, the narrative frequently utilizes one or more recurring jokes throughout the series unique to that main character. Examples include Arale Norimaki from the manga Dr. Slump, or Marvel Comics' Squirrel Girl, among other examples. Due to being protagonists of their own respective show, such characters tend to be given more characterization and be put in a variety of scenarios, typically in parallel or in contrast to potentially much more serious characters.

See also
Unseen character
Generic character (fiction)

Fictional characters by role in the narrative structure